The Lam Sơn uprising was a Vietnamese rebellion led by Lê Lợi in the province of Jiaozhi from 1418 to 1427 against the rule of Ming China. The success of the rebellion led to the establishment of the Later Lê dynasty by Lê Lợi in Đại Việt.

Background

The Ming Dynasty under Emperor Yongle destroyed the Hồ dynasty in 1407 and incorporated Dai Ngu into the Empire as Jiaozhi Province. However, at first they met fierce resistance from the former Trần dynasty members, led by Prince Trần Ngỗi. Although the rebellion was defeated, it provided inspiration for future Vietnamese movements. A total of 31 revolts occurred from 1415 to 1424 against Ming rule before the rebellion of Lê Lợi in 1418. The Ming army guarding in Jiaozhi consisted of at least 87,000 regular troops, scattering in 39 citadels and towns in Northern Vietnam.

History

Revolt in Thanh Hóa 1418–1423 
On February 7, 1416, a group of 18 men including Lê Lợi and Nguyễn Trãi, banded together discussing a revolt against Ming forces. During Tết (Lunar New Year) of 1418, Lê Lợi raised the revolt flag against Ming rule in Lam Sơn, Thanh Hóa. He proclaimed himself Bình Định Vương (平定王; "Prince of Pacification"). Lê Lợi divided his army into small bands of partisan fighters and utilized guerrilla tactics to fight against regular Ming units.

In February, a Ming army under general Ma Ji attacked Lam Sơn, but was ambushed by Lam Sơn partisans near the Chu River. A betrayer led the Ming army to Lam Sơn to attack Lê Lợi in surprise. Lê Lợi's nine-year-old daughter was taken as hostage and sent to Yongle's harem. 

In 1419, the forces of Lê Lợi attacked and seized a Ming garrison near Lam Sơn. In late 1420, the competent Ming commander Li Bin led a Ming army to attack Mường Thôi, but was defeated. The Lam Sơn partisans later gained control of the upper Mã River. 

In the next year, a large Ming army under General Chen Zhi marched to the Mã River valley to attack the Lam Sơn rebels. From the opposite direction, a Laotian army with 30,000 men and 100 elephants from Lan Xang approached down the valley. Lê Lợi initially had the impression that the Laotians were allied to him. Lo Van Luat, an officer of Li Bin, however viewed Lê Lợi as a rival. He persuaded the Laotians to join the Ming to attack Lê Lợi. In 1422, due to exhaustion and lacking of provisions during the battle, Lê Lợi was forced to disband his partisans and sued for peace by paying gold and silver and promise the Ming administration not to renew insurgency; he then returned to Lam Sơn. In return the Ming provided him with food provision and farm implements.

Capture of Nghệ An and southern provinces (1425) 
Nguyễn Chích, a commander of Lam Son, suggested that they should have moved to the south to the province of Nghệ An. In December 1424, the Lam Sơn partisans seized the control of Vinh Citadel. In June 1425, Lê Lợi's generals Lê Sát and Lưu Nhân Chú attacked Thanh Hóa. In the south, the Lam Sơn army under Trần Nguyên Hãn defeated a Ming army in modern Quảng Bình and then marched through modern Quảng Trị and Thừa Thiên, gaining control of the southern lands. By the end of 1425, the rebel army had already conquered all lands from Thanh Hóa to Da Nang.

Pushing north (1426-27)
The new emperor of China, Zhu Zhanji or Xuande Emperor, in 1426 proclaimed a general amnesty and abolished all taxes in Jiaozhi, except for land taxes to be paid in rice, which were needed to supply local Ming garrisons. In September that year, Lê Lợi sent his armies led by his generals, Trịnh Khả, Lý Triện, Đỗ Bí, Lưu Nhân Chú, Bùi Bị, Đinh Lễ and Nguyễn Xí to advance on the Red River Delta and onward the Sino-Vietnamese border. Lê Lợi installed Trần Cảo as king of Dai Viet.

Battle of Tốt Động-Chúc Động 

The Ming army under General Wang Tong responded by counterattacking the Vietnamese rebels in Ninh Kiều, south of Hà Nội. On December 4, 54,000 Ming troops engaged 3,000 or 6,000 Vietnamese troops in the 1426 Battle of Tốt Động – Chúc Động. The battle ended with a decisive Vietnamese victory. Most of the Ming firearms and weapons were captured.

Siege of Đông Quan 

On December 8, the Lam Sơn army laid siege of Đông Quan (Hà Nội), the Ming stronghold on the Red River Delta, and captured it in January 1427. Cai Fu, a Ming commander-in-chief and an engineer, surrendered to Lê Lợi, and began teaching the Vietnamese how to make siege weapons.

Siege of Xương Giang 
In March 1427, the Ming citadel of Xương Giang in at the modern city of Bắc Giang was being besieged. Ming prisoners and defectors provided the Vietnamese manufacturing and launching siege weapons such as primitive tanks (fenwen che), counterweight trebuchets invented by the Muslims (Xiangyang pao or Huihui pao) and hand cannons (huopao). The siege took six months and the citadel felt to the rebel hands.

On March 29, 1427, around 120,000 Chinese reinforcements led by Liu Sheng and Mu Sheng advanced into Jiaozhi from Yunnan and Guangxi, included 10,000 crack troops who had followed Zheng He on his expeditions, vying to retake the region for the Chinese.

Battle of Chi Lăng 

In September, Liu Sheng's force was ambushed by Lê Lợi at Chi Lăng Pass. The commander, Liu Sheng, was beheaded at the battle. The prolonged war and dire situation of Ming army in Jiaozhi had drained the Empires resources down, leading to compromise. On 29 December 1427, Wang Tong accepted Nguyễn Trãi's terms of orderly withdrawal with "the solemn oath of eternal friendship." After the treaty, Lê Lợi repatriated 86,640 Ming prisoners to China and disarmed them of all of their weapons. In 1428, Lê Lợi became king of a restored Dai Viet, and ordered Nguyễn Trãi to write the Binh Ngo Dai Cao (Grand Pronouncements).

Officials in the Chinese court criticized Wang Tong's performance in the war. Wang was demoted to a commoner and deprived of his land, but later regained them after participating in the Defense of Beijing in 1449.

Legend of Hoàn Kiếm Lake 
According to legend, in early 1428, Emperor Lê Lợi was boating on the Hoàn Kiếm lake when a golden turtle surfaced and asked for his magic sword. Lê Lợi concluded that the turtle had come to reclaim the sword that its master, the "Dragon King" (Long Vương) had given to Lê Lợi some time earlier, during his revolt. Later, Lê Lợi gave the sword back to the turtle after he finished fighting off the Chinese. He later renamed the lake "Hoàn Kiếm" (Lake of the Returning Sword) to commemorate the event.

References

Bibliography

 
 
 
 
  

 
 
 
 
  
 
 
 

1410s conflicts
1420s conflicts
15th century in Vietnam
15th-century rebellions
History of Vietnam
Peasant revolts
Rebellions in Vietnam
Wars involving the Ming dynasty
Wars involving Vietnam
Wars between China and Vietnam
China–Vietnam relations
Military history of Vietnam
Rebellions in the Ming dynasty